"Out of My Mind" is the first single released by the Belgian dance group Lasgo after the addition of Jelle Van Dael as vocals. The single achieved chart success in the Netherlands and Belgium, making it into the top 10. The song was also released in the UK at the beginning of 2009 by the up-and-coming dance label Hard2Beat records however, as it was given a digital only release, but the song failed to chart.

Track listing
CD Maxi-Single (Belgium and United States)
"Out of My Mind" (Radio Edit) – 3:00
"Out of My Mind" (Extended Mix) – 4:37
"Out of My Mind" (Sebastian Dali Remix) – 7:11
"Out of My Mind" (Felix Project Remix) – 6:46

Chart performance

References

External links 

2008 singles
Lasgo songs
2008 songs
Songs written by Basto (musician)
Songs written by Peter Luts